Albania (ALB) competed at the 2018 Mediterranean Games in Tarragona, Spain, from the 22 June to 1 July 2018 and was represented by the Albanian National Olympic Committee (KOKSH).

Medalists

Swimming 

Albania competed in swimming.

Men

Women

References 

Mediterranean Games
2018
Albania